Jeunesse Athletique Armentières is a French football team founded in 1911. They are based in Armentières, France and are playing in the Championnat de France Amateurs 2 Group A, the fifth tier in the French football league system. They play at the Stade Léo Lagrange in Armentières.

From 1996–2001, the club played at the fourth level of French football, the Championnat de France Amateurs but were relegated after finishing 16th in their group.

Current squad

 

Football clubs in France
Association football clubs established in 1911
1911 establishments in France
Sport in Nord (French department)
Football clubs in Hauts-de-France